Keadue is a townland in County Donegal, Ireland. It is in the Rosses region of northwest County Donegal, on the R259 road on the Wild Atlantic Way, about halfway between the fishing villages of Burtonport and Kincasslagh on the Atlantic coast.

Sport
Keadue is most well known for its football team, Keadue Rovers, who play their home games at Central Park in Keadue.  Ireland goalkeeper, Packie Bonner, from nearby Cloughglass, started his career at Keadue.

The local GAA team is An Clochán Liath, who play 8 km away in An Clochán Liath.  Gaelic football All-Star, Tony Boyle, member of the 1992 Donegal All-Ireland winning team,  was born in Keadue.

UFC mixed martial artist, Joseph Duffy is from Meenbanad, the bordering townland.

Language
Keadue is in the Gaeltacht region, which means the official language of the area is Irish. However, the use of Irish has been in decline since the 1950s.

Education
The local national school is Keadue National School with 34 pupils, and the nearest secondary school is Rosses Community School in Dungloe.

Music
Since 1888, Keadue has been home to The Keadue Band, one of many marching fife and drum bands from the area.

Transport
Keadue is situated 10 km from Donegal International Airport which is serviced by daily Aer Lingus flights to Dublin Airport and also does a flight to Glasgow.

References

Townlands of County Donegal